World Trade Center Copenhagen is a proposed complex in Ørestad, a development zone between Copenhagen's city center and Copenhagen Airport in Denmark. Designed by Kim Utzon, son of architect Jørn Utzon, who designed the Sydney Opera House.  The centre is planned to comprise three high-rise office blocks of 20 stories each, with the rest of the building between 7 and 9 floors in height.

The  of floorspace will host a wide range of facilities including restaurants, cafés, shops, a hotel, an exhibition centre and conference facilities.

References 

Buildings and structures in Copenhagen
Economy of Copenhagen
Geography of Copenhagen
Proposed buildings and structures in Denmark
Tourist attractions in Copenhagen
Copenhagen